Yana Uqsha (Quechua yana black, very dark, uqsha (locally), uqsa high altitude grass, Hispanicized spelling Yanaocsha) is a mountain in the Andes of Peru, about  high. It is located in the Lima Region, Cajatambo Province, Cajatambo District. Yana Uqsha lies northwest of Pishtaq.

References 

Mountains of Peru
Mountains of Lima Region